The Oil Valley Film Festival is an annual American film festival in Oil City, Pennsylvania.

The festival comprises competitive sections for American and international narrative and documentary films, both feature-length films and short films, and a curated block of out-of-competition selections. Audience favorites in feature and short categories, as voted on by the attending audiences, receive prizes separate from jury prizes. The festival also includes a screenwriting competition.

Festival Programming 
The Oil Valley Film Festival consists of film programming over a three-day period. Day one provides the juried short film program. Day two provides the juried feature film program, with a social event for filmmakers and audience members to interact. Day three provides the audience members to watch a curated program consisting of films chosen by the festival's director. Beginning in 2017, the festival began various panels of discussion featuring filmmakers, actors, and producers from the selected films. Topics for each panel vary.

History 
The Oil Valley Film Festival was founded by Matt Croyle in 2015, in an effort to bring new and established cinema to the underrepresented region of Venango County, Pennsylvania, with the first festival taking place September 1–3, 2016. It is the first international film festival of its kind in Pennsylvania's Oil Region. Croyle stated that his ambition was to bring art house works to an audience who would not normally be able to see non-mainstream films.

The founding of the festival garnered attention from established industry publications and organizations, ultimately resulting in partnerships with Videomaker Magazine and The Writers Store.

In the festival's inaugural year, the feature film Audience Prize was awarded to Vincent Pereira for his 1997 film A Better Place, one of the lesser known View Askew Productions films, produced by Kevin Smith and Scott Mosier. A Better Place screened out of jury competition, in the curated block, but was chosen by the audience as their favorite feature of the festival. Filmmaker Zach Daulton, of Ohio, was awarded the short film Audience Prize for his film 'Mayfield.'

In its first year, the Oil Valley Film Festival received submissions from twelve countries on five continents.

On August 25, 2021, the festival was named one of the Top Ten Virtual Film Festivals for the month of September by Filmocracy, due to the festival's online option for viewers.

The 2022 festival featured more high-profile creatives than previous iterations including Oscar winners Cloris Leachman and Olympia Dukakis, in their final screen roles, along with Louis Gossett Jr., Tatum O’Neal and George Chakiris.

Addition of an online screening element 
The 2020 Oil Valley Film Festival partnered with the streaming service Festivee to bring the selected films to audiences digitally. This decision was made because of the COVID-19 pandemic.

The streaming element stayed in place for the 2021 Oil Valley Film Festival, and festival director Matt Croyle has expressed interest in keeping the festival hybrid to accommodate global viewership.

Notable Guests and Interviews 
2020: Writer and director James Merendino of SLC Punk and the multifaceted D.B. Sweeney of Eight Men Out, The Cutting Edge, and Memphis Belle.

2021: Natalie Metzger, producer of Werewolves Within, The Beta Test, and Thunder Road, along with screenwriter Jason Usry.

2022: Suzanne Romero, Executive Director of The George A. Romero Foundation, along with filmmaker Al White, and editor Michael Foster.

Award winners

References

External links 
 – official site
Oil Valley Film Festival on FilmFreeway – festival information and submissions
Oil Valley Film Festival on IMDb - winners from past events via the Internet Movie Database

Film festivals established in 2015
Annual events in Pennsylvania
Film festivals in Pennsylvania
Tourist attractions in Venango County, Pennsylvania